Olympia Armory is a historic National Guard armory located at Olympia, near Columbia, Richland County, South Carolina.

History
The armory was built in 1936-1937 by the Works Progress Administration (WPA).  It is a one-story, rectangular brick building with a barrel-vaulted roof and stepped parapeted end walls. The building displays Art Deco and Moderne design influences.  It was used as a school gymnasium.

It was added to the National Register of Historic Places in 1996.

The Columbia Armory currently houses the headquarters of the South Carolina State Guard.

References

Works Progress Administration in South Carolina
Armories on the National Register of Historic Places in South Carolina
Government buildings completed in 1937
Moderne architecture in South Carolina
Art Deco architecture in South Carolina
Buildings and structures in Richland County, South Carolina
National Register of Historic Places in Richland County, South Carolina